Goatfucking Gent/Vivicomburium is a split EP by the black metal band Horna. It was released on Obscure Abhorrene Productions in 2005. It was limited to 738 copies.

Track listing
Horna
Mustasiipinen - 4:43 
Vihasta ja arvista - 4:44  
Sinulle, mätänevä Jehova - 6:04  
Örkkivuorilta - 4:15  
Kerberos
Burning Black Vomit - 3:15  
Baphomet's Acolytes - 4:56  
Death's Prophet - 4:59 
The Holocaust of Man's Destruction - 3:21
Satanas (Sarcófago cover) - 3:02

External links
Metal Archives
Official Horna Site

2005 EPs
Horna EPs
Split EPs